Dar Gol-e Teymaz (also Romanized as Dār Gol-e Teymaz) is a village in Haft Ashiyan Rural District, Kuzaran District, Kermanshah County, Kermanshah Province, Iran. At the 2006 census, its population was 109, in 23 families.

References 

Populated places in Kermanshah County